Everton Cardoso da Silva (born 11 December 1988), simply known as Everton,  is a Brazilian professional footballer who plays as a left winger for Campeonato Brasileiro Série B club Ponte Preta, on loan from Grêmio.

Career

Paraná

Desportivo Brasil

Flamengo (loan)
On August 19, 2008, Everton joined Brazilian Série A club Flamengo. On August 31, 2008, he debuted for Flamengo already playing in the first team, in the Fla-Flu derby, when his club and Fluminense drew 2–2 for the Brazilian Série A.

In 2009, with coach Cuca Everton began playing as a left wing back replacing Juan for several matches. Also in 2009 he scored his first goal for Flamengo in the Brazilian Série A in a 3–1 win against Atlético Mineiro; besides the goal he managed to grab an assist, being one of the best players in that match.

Tigres UANL
In January 2010 Everton signed his transfer to Tigres UANL for US$6 million, the third highest fee paid by a Mexican club.

Botafogo (loan)
In January 2011 Botafogo loaned Everton from UANL Tigres until the end of the year.

Suwon Bluewings (loan)

Atlético Paranaense (loan)

Flamengo
On 27 December 2013 Flamengo announced Everton's signing from Tigres UANL.

In October 2016 Everton alongside, Alan Patrick, Marcelo Cirino, Pará and Paulinho got involved in trouble through the media due to excessive partying. The group of players were called "Bonde da Stella", because of the name of a brand of beer they used to drink in those parties. All five players were fined causing embarrassment with the club's directors, but only Paulinho left the club for the following season on loan to Santos.

On 3 February 2017 Everton agreed to a contract extension with Flamengo until 2019.

On 5 July 2017 Everton completed 100 Brazilian Série A matches for Flamengo playing against São Paulo.

São Paulo
On 17 April 2018 São Paulo signed Everton after agreeing to pay his €3,5m release clause from Flamengo on a contract until 30 June 2021.

Career statistics

Honours
Flamengo
Campeonato Carioca: 2009, 2014, 2017
Campeonato Brasileiro Série A: 2009

Grêmio
Campeonato Gaúcho: 2020, 2021
Recopa Gaúcha: 2021

Personal life
His younger brother Ebert Cardoso da Silva is also a professional football player.

References

External links

CBF 
placar 
Player Profile @Flamengo.com.br 
Futpédia 

1988 births
Living people
Sportspeople from Mato Grosso
Brazilian footballers
Brazilian expatriate footballers
Paraná Clube players
Desportivo Brasil players
CR Flamengo footballers
Tigres UANL footballers
Botafogo de Futebol e Regatas players
Suwon Samsung Bluewings players
Club Athletico Paranaense players
São Paulo FC players
Grêmio Foot-Ball Porto Alegrense players
Cuiabá Esporte Clube players
Campeonato Brasileiro Série A players
Campeonato Brasileiro Série B players
Liga MX players
K League 1 players
Brazilian expatriate sportspeople in Mexico
Expatriate footballers in Mexico
Brazilian expatriate sportspeople in South Korea
Expatriate footballers in South Korea
Association football midfielders